Marcela Valera Ceballos (born 12 April 1987) is a Mexican professional footballer who plays as a central defender for Santos Laguna and the Mexico women's national team.

Club career
Valera played previously for Atlas, where she served as their captain.

International career
Valera made her senior international debut for Mexico on 23 October 2017.

References

External links 
 

1987 births
Living people
Footballers from Guadalajara, Jalisco
Mexican women's footballers
Women's association football central defenders
Santos Laguna (women) players
Liga MX Femenil players
Mexico women's international footballers
Mexican footballers